Paul Blackburn (born 29 March 1934) is an English cricketer. He played one first-class match for Cambridge University Cricket Club in 1954.

See also
 List of Cambridge University Cricket Club players

References

External links
 

1934 births
Living people
English cricketers
Cambridge University cricketers
Sportspeople from Stockport